Frode Grodås (born 24 October 1964) is a Norwegian football coach and former national team goalkeeper originally from Hornindal in Sogn og Fjordane. Capped 50 times for his country, he participated at the 1998 FIFA World Cup as well as being an unused substitute at the 1994 FIFA World Cup.

Playing career

During his career he played for several Norwegian clubs. After his ten-year spell at Lillestrøm he spent six years abroad, in England, Germany and Spain. He won the English FA Cup in 1997 with Chelsea, keeping a clean sheet in a 2–0 win in the final. He rounded off his career with Norwegian Division One team Hønefoss.

Grodås was last capped in 2002, aged 37 years and 318 days, and is the fourth oldest player at the Norwegian national team.

Coaching career
He has education from the Norwegian School of Sport Sciences. After retiring as a player, Grodås received the highest level of football coach education in Norway and took over HamKam from 1 December 2005. However, Grodås couldn't deliver the results, and Ham-Kam was relegated. Grodås was fired on 7 November 2006.

In December 2006, Grodås signed a three-year contract with Lillestrøm as a goalkeeper-coach. Grodås is then back in what he regards as his home club. He has also acted as the third-choice goalkeeper for the club. In June 2007 Lillestrøm's first-choice goalkeeper Heinz Müller received a two match suspension after hitting Geir Ludvig Fevang with his left knee. As a result of this, Grodås sat on the substitute bench as backup goalie during the Tippeliga-match against Sandefjord later that month. He returned to the bench in August 2007 after an injury to Müller.

After Lillestrøm manager Tom Nordlie had resigned on 29 May 2008, Grodås stepped in as caretaker together with former Chelsea teammate Erland Johnsen.

In 2010, Grodås ended his term with Lillestrøm in a mutual agreement and took over as goalkeeper-coach for the Norwegian national team.

Personal life
Grodås' son, Victor Grodås, is also a footballer, playing for Hødd from Ulsteinvik.

Career statistics

Club
Source:

International
Source:

Honours
Lillestrøm
1. divisjon: 1989
Norwegian Football Cup runner-up: 1992

Chelsea
FA Cup: 1996–97

Schalke 04
DFB-Pokal: 2000–01, 2001–02
DFB-Ligapokal runner-up: 2001

Individual
Kniksen Award Goalkeeper of the Year: 1991, 1993
VG Goalkeeper of the Year: 1993
Romerikes Blad Athlete of the Year: 1993

References

External links

1964 births
Living people
People from Volda
1994 FIFA World Cup players
1998 FIFA World Cup players
Chelsea F.C. players
Association football goalkeepers
Hønefoss BK players
Kniksen Award winners
La Liga players
Lillestrøm SK players
Norway international footballers
Norwegian expatriate footballers
Expatriate footballers in England
Expatriate footballers in Germany
Expatriate footballers in Spain
Norwegian football managers
Norwegian footballers
People from Hornindal
Eliteserien players
Premier League players
Bundesliga players
FC Schalke 04 players
Sogndal Fotball players
Tottenham Hotspur F.C. players
Norwegian School of Sport Sciences alumni
Sevilla FC players
Hamarkameratene managers
FA Cup Final players
Sportspeople from Møre og Romsdal